Aleksandr Aleksandrovich Kalyagin (born 25 May 1942) is a Soviet and Russian actor and director, member of the Civic Chamber of the Russian Federation, People's Artist of the RSFSR (1983), Laureate of the State Prizes for his works in the theater and the cinema. He is best known for his roles in the films Hello, I'm Your Aunt! (1975) and Dead Souls (1984).

Biography 

In 1965 Kalyagin graduated from the Boris Shchukin Theatre Institute and later worked in Moscow Art Theatre and some other Moscow theaters. In 1996 he was elected the Head of the Union of Theatrical Figures of Russia, and in 2003 he joined the United Russia party. Currently he is an art director of the Moscow Theater 'Et Cetera'.

Filmography
Actor
 Long-Haired Wonder (1974)
 Hello, I'm Your Aunt! (1975)
 A Slave of Love (1976)
 Wounded Game (1977)
 Interrogation (1979)
 The Old New Year (1980)
 Dead Souls (1984)
 A Rogue's Saga (1984)
 The Last Road (1986)
 The Kreutzer Sonata (1987)
 Me Ivan, You Abraham (1993)
 Children of Iron Gods (1993)

Voice actor
 Leopold the Cat (1975–1987)
 Tale of Tales (1979)

References

External links

Alexander Kalyagin official website

1942 births
Living people
20th-century Russian male actors
21st-century Russian male actors
People from Kirov Oblast
Academicians of the National Academy of Motion Picture Arts and Sciences of Russia
Members of the Civic Chamber of the Russian Federation
Academic staff of Moscow Art Theatre School
Honored Artists of the RSFSR
People's Artists of the RSFSR
Recipients of the Order "For Merit to the Fatherland", 2nd class
Recipients of the Order "For Merit to the Fatherland", 3rd class
Recipients of the Order "For Merit to the Fatherland", 4th class
Recipients of the Order of Honour (Russia)
Recipients of the USSR State Prize
Jewish Russian actors
United Russia politicians
Russian male film actors
Russian male stage actors
Russian male voice actors
Russian theatre directors
Soviet male film actors
Soviet male stage actors
Soviet male voice actors
Soviet theatre directors